Harinakano Station(針中野駅, -eki) is a railway station on the Kintetsu Minami Osaka Line in Komagawa Gochome, Higashisumiyoshi-ku, Osaka, Japan.

Layout
The station has 2 elevated side platforms serving a track each (3rd level).

Surroundings
Komagawa Shopping Arcade (駒川商店街)
Gyoza no Ohsho
Mister Donut
McDonald's
CoCo Ichimanya
Tsutaya
Joshin
Supermarket KINSHO
Komagawa-Nakano Station - Osaka Metro Tanimachi Line
Osaka Municipal Higashisumiyoshi Library
Osaka Municipal Nakano Junior High School
Osaka Municipal Minami-Kudara Elementary School
Osaka Municipal Higashi-Tanabe Elementary School
Osaka Municipal Takaai Elementary School

Stations next to Harinakano

Higashisumiyoshi-ku, Osaka
Railway stations in Japan opened in 1923
Railway stations in Osaka